Carex gracilis can refer to:

Carex gracilis A.Gray, a synonym of Carex disperma Dewey
Carex gracilis Curtis, a synonym of Carex acuta L.
Carex gracilis Honck., a synonym of Carex mucronata All.
Carex gracilis R.Br., a synonym of Carex lenta D.Don
Carex gracilis Wimm., a synonym of Carex elata subsp. elata All.